Dermod McMurrough O'Brien (died 1 May 1557) was the 2nd Baron Inchiquin. He was the son of Murrough O'Brien, 1st Earl of Thomond and Eleanor FitzGerald. O'Brien married Margaret O'Brien, daughter of Donough O'Brien, 2nd Earl of Thomond (a nephew of Murrough O'Brien, 1st Earl of Thomond).

He died at Ennis Abbey in 1557. The title passed to his son Murrough McDermot O'Brien, 3rd Baron Inchiquin.

References

1557 deaths
Dermod
People from County Clare
16th-century Irish people
Year of birth unknown
People of Elizabethan Ireland
Barons Inchiquin